The 2005–06 South Pacific cyclone season was an event in the annual cycle of tropical cyclone formation. It began on November 1, 2005, and ended on April 30, 2006. These dates conventionally delimit the period of each year when most tropical cyclones form in the southern Pacific Ocean east of 160°E. Additionally, the regional tropical cyclone operational plan defines a tropical cyclone year separately from a tropical cyclone season, and the "tropical cyclone year" runs from July 1, 2005, to June 30, 2006.

Tropical cyclones between 160°E and 120°W and north of 25°S are monitored by the Fiji Meteorological Service in Nadi. Those that move south of 25°S are monitored by the Tropical Cyclone Warning Centre in Wellington, New Zealand.



Seasonal forecasts 

During October 2005, both RSMC Nadi and New Zealand's National Institute of Water and Atmospheric Research issued seasonal forecasts which contained information on what was expected to occur during the 2005–06 tropical cyclone season. Both agencies expected that the season would see a near average amount of tropical cyclone activity due there being no El Niño or La Niña. As a result of these conditions RSMC Nadi predicted that between 7–9 tropical cyclones would develop while NIWA did not predict how many tropical cyclone there would be during the season. RSMC Nadi also reported that Fiji had a higher chance of being hit by a tropical cyclone this season than during recent previous seasons. NIWA also predicted that there was an average risk of a tropical cyclone coming within , of: Fiji, Tonga, Niue, Vanuatu, New Caledonia, Wallis and Futuna, the Southern Cook Islands, Samoa, and New Zealand.

Seasonal summary

Systems

Tropical Depression 03F 

Formed on December 8 and dissipated on December 18, 2005.

Tropical Cyclone Tam 

Tam originated as Tropical Depression 04F near 15°S 179.5°E on January 6. The system then lingered around for a few days, appearing to significantly weaken, but strengthened later. As Tam moved southeastward on January 12, a gale warning was issued for Tonga and later for Niue as well as American Samoa. Tam accelerated towards south-southeast and became extratropical on January 14.

Tropical Depression 05F 

Formed on January 10 and dissipated on January 13, 2006.

Tropical Cyclone Urmil 

The second named storm of the season formed out of a weak tropical disturbance on January 13. With favorable environmental conditions in the wake of Tropical Cyclone Tam, the depression rapidly organized, strengthening into a Category 1 cyclone six hours after the first advisory was issued and was given the name Urmil. Several hours later, the JTWC also began issuing advisories on Urmil, designating it as Tropical Cyclone 07P. On January 14, Urmil underwent a brief period explosive deepening, attaining its peak intensity of  10-min). Not long after reaching its peak, increased wind shear, cooler waters, and faster forward motion caused the storm to weaken. By January 15, Urmil transitioned into an extratropical cyclone. Later that day, the remnants of the storm were absorbed into the mid-latitude westerlies.

Tropical Cyclone Urmil had little impact on land, with gale-force winds being felt only in Tonga. Heavy rains exaggerated flooding produced by Cyclone Tam earlier in January and caused minor crop damages.

Tropical Depression 07F 

The seventh depression of the season developed on January 15 as Urmil was dissipating. The system peaked in intensity with winds of  later that day.

Severe Tropical Cyclone Jim 

Cyclone Jim originated in the Australian region, and moved into Fiji's area of responsibility on January 30. Jim gradually turned south-southeastward and became extratropical on February 1. The extratropical remnants of Jim (08F) lingered around and then moved northwest.

Despite being well to the west of that country, Cyclone Jim was blamed for extensive flooding in Fiji, with the western coast of the island of Viti Levu – including the city of Lautoka – inundated by floodwaters on January 29. No fatalities were reported in any of the areas affected by the cyclone.

Tropical Depression 10F 

Tracking erratically in a southerly direction, the depression slowly weakened as convection was displaced by wind shear.

Tropical Depression 11F 

Formed on February 8 and dissipated on February 10, 2006.

Severe Tropical Cyclone Vaianu 

Tropical Depression 12F formed near 14.5°S 176.1°W on February 10 and a tropical cyclone alert was raised in Tonga. This is the third tropical system to threaten Tonga this season. At that time, another Tropical Depression (11F) was to its south causing unstable movements of the two depressions due to a Fujiwara interaction. On the next day, 12F became the dominant system and moved south. Strengthening into Tropical Cyclone Vaianu, it turned southwest and passed between Fiji and Tonga. On February 13, Vaianu resumed a southward track and reached hurricane intensity. Vaianu then struck the Tonga islands as a Category 1 cyclone on the Saffir–Simpson scale, knocking down power lines and flattening crops, such as banana and mango trees. In Nukualofa, low-lying areas were shut down because of flooding. On February 13, Vaianu reached its peak intensity of 85 mp/h, but these peak winds were well away from the Tonga and Fiji islands, but Tonga still felt Vaianu's winds. Then, the cyclone accelerated towards the southeast, entered TCWC Wellington's area of responsibility and became extratropical on February 16.

Tropical Depression 13F 

Formed on February 19 and dissipated on February 26, 2006.

Severe Tropical Cyclone Wati 

Tropical Depression 16F formed on March 17 and strengthened into Tropical Cyclone Wati on March 19 north of New Caledonia. It moved westwards and slowly strengthened into a Category 3 cyclone on the Australian scale before coming to a near standstill over the Coral Sea. After remaining stationary for most of March 22, Wati took a southeasterly course on March 23, gaining speed and continuing that course on March 24. A cyclone watch was issued for Lord Howe Island and a cyclone warning was issued for Norfolk Island. Wati passed between the two islands and became extratropical on March 25.

The remains of Wati brought heavy rain and strong winds to the North Island of New Zealand on March 26, with gusts of 140 km/h reported at Cape Reinga.

Other systems 
During November 30, the FMS reported that Tropical Depression 01F had developed to the southeast of American Samoa. At this time the system was poorly organized and located within a region of weak vertical wind shear, to the southeast of an upper-level outflow. Over the next couple of days, atmospheric convection surrounding the system failed to become organized and became displaced to the east and south of the center, as it moved south-eastwards into an area of increasing vertical wind shear. Over the next few days, the system remained poorly organized and fairly diffused, while an upper-level trough of low pressure approached the system from the west-southwest. This trough steered the system towards the southeastwards and exposed it to strong westerly winds, before the FMS issued their final advisory on the system during December 6.

During January 30, the FMS briefly monitored Tropical Depression 09F, which was thought to be located to the north-northeast of New Caledonia. The system was being steered into an environment of increasing vertical wind shear, while atmospheric convection was active within the systems eastern quadrant and was detached from the systems center.

Over the next couple of days the system moved southwards and never became well organised, before it was last noted by the FMS during March 16. The precursor tropical low to Severe Tropical Cyclone Larry moved into the basin, from the Australian region and was assigned the designator 16F by the FMS during March 16. However, during that day the system recurved and moved back into the Australian region during the next day, where it later made landfall near Innisfail, Queensland and caused widespread damage to Queensland. Over the next day the system moved south-eastwards and remained weak and exposed, with deep convection displaced to the south and east of the low level circulation centre. The system was subsequently last noted by the FMS during April 21, as it left the tropics. During the final days of April, several depressions to the east of the International Date Line were noted by the FMS, however, none of these were referred to as tropical depressions.

Season effects 

|-
| 01F ||  || bgcolor=#| || bgcolor=#| || bgcolor=#| || None || None || None ||
|-
| 02F ||  || bgcolor=#| || bgcolor=#| || bgcolor=#| || None || None || None ||
|-
| Tam ||  || bgcolor=#| || bgcolor=#| || bgcolor=#| || American Samoa, Rotuma, Niue, Tonga, Futuna|| $26,000 || None ||
|-
| 09F ||  || bgcolor=#| || bgcolor=#| || bgcolor=#| || None || None || None ||
|}

See also 

 Tropical cyclones in 2005 and 2006
 List of Southern Hemisphere tropical cyclone seasons
 Atlantic hurricane seasons: 2005, 2006
 Pacific hurricane seasons: 2005, 2006
 Pacific typhoon seasons: 2005, 2006
 North Indian Ocean cyclone seasons: 2005, 2006

References

External links 

 
South Pacific cyclone seasons
Articles which contain graphical timelines
2005 SPac
2005 SPac